Electra is a play by Rajiva Wijesinha. It is based on the Oresteia by Aeschylus, Electra by Sophocles, Electra by Euripides and The Flies by Jean-Paul Sartre. It was written in 1970, but a radio production in early 1971 was banned because of political sensitivity. The play was finally presented on radio by the Sri Lanka Broadcasting Corporation in 1985, at which time a public reading was also held at the British Council in Colombo.

References

The Best of British Bluff. The Island, Retrieved on 21 March 2010.

Electra (Rajiva Wijesinha)
Plays based on classical mythology
Plays based on ancient Greek and Roman plays
Plays based on works by Aeschylus
Plays based on works by Euripides
Plays based on works by Sophocles
Sri Lankan fiction
Works based on The Libation Bearers